The 1957–58 season was Colchester United's 16th season in their history and their eighth season in the Third Division South, the third tier of English football. Alongside competing in the Third Division South, the club also participated in the FA Cup. They were eliminated at the first round stage of the cup for the fifth successive season, on this occasion to non-league side Wisbech Town. In the league, with the division being restructured at the end of the season, Colchester managed to finish in the top half of the table by three points to avoid a move to the newly formed Fourth Division, instead remaining in the third tier.

Season overview
With Football League reorganisation looming at the end of the season, Colchester's priority for the 1957–58 season was to finish in the top half of the table to join the top half of the Third Division North to form the new nationwide Third Division. The other teams would form the Fourth Division.

During the campaign, Benny Fenton's squad suffered from numerous call-ups for national service, and as such Fenton brought in reinforcements in November with Neil Langman arriving from Plymouth Argyle for £6,750 and John Evans for £4,000 from Liverpool. Meanwhile, Birmingham City offered Colchester £10,000 for winger Peter Wright, but he opted to remain as a part-time player.

Colchester secured their place in the third tier for another season in the final game of the season when they beat Southampton 4–2 at Layer Road.

Players

Transfers

In

 Total spending:  ~ £11,375

Out

 Total incoming:  ~ £1,050

Match details

Third Division South

Results round by round

League table

Matches

FA Cup

Squad statistics

Appearances and goals

|}

Goalscorers

Disciplinary record

Clean sheets
Number of games goalkeepers kept a clean sheet.

Player debuts
Players making their first-team Colchester United debut in a fully competitive match.

See also
List of Colchester United F.C. seasons

References

General
Books

Websites

Specific

1957-58
English football clubs 1957–58 season